Epictia signata, or the South American blind snake, is a species of snake in the family Leptotyphlopidae. The species is endemic to northwestern South America.

Geographic range
E. signatus is found in Colombia, Ecuador, and Venezuela.

References

Further reading
Adalsteinsson SA, Branch WR, Trape S, Vitt LJ, Hedges SB (2009). "Molecular phylogeny, classification, and biogeography of snakes of the family Leptotyphlopidae (Reptilia, Squamata)". Zootaxa 2244: 1-50. (Epictia signata, new combination).
Boulenger GA (1893). Catalogue of the Snakes in the British Museum (Natural History). Volume I., Containing the Families ... Glauconiidæ ... London: Trustees of the British Museum (Natural History). (Taylor and Francis, printers). xiii + 448 pp. + Plates I-XXVIII. (Glauconia signata, new combination, p. 64).
Freiberg M (1982). Snakes of South America. Hong Kong: T.F.H. Publications. 189 pp. . ("Leptotyphlops signatum [sic]", p. 118).
Jan [G] (1861). Iconographie générale des Ophidiens, Deuxième livraison [= General Iconography of the Snakes, Second Issue]. [illustrated by Ferdinando Sordelli]. Paris: [J.-B. Baillière]. index + Plates I-VI. (Stenostoma signatum, new species, Plate V, figure 3 & Plate VI, figure 3, ten views). (in French).

Epictia
Reptiles described in 1861